Darby Medlyn (born 7 November 1999) is a professional rugby league footballer who plays as a  for the Canberra Raiders in the NRL.

Career

2020
Medlyn made his first grade debut in round 20 of the 2020 NRL season for Canberra against the Cronulla-Sutherland Sharks at Kogarah Oval.

2021
Medlyn made no appearances for Canberra in the 2021 NRL season.  He was later released by the club.

References

External links
Raiders profile

1999 births
Living people
Australian rugby league players
Rugby league locks
Canberra Raiders players